The Concrete Jungle is a 1982 American women in prison film directed by Tom DeSimone and featuring Jill St. John and Tracey E. Bregman.

Plot
A woman is unsuspectingly used to carry her boyfriend's stash of cocaine in her skis and is caught by airport security.  She is tried, convicted and sent to prison where she quickly learns to toughen up if she wants to survive.

Cast
Jill St. John as Warden Fletcher 
Tracey E. Bregman as Elizabeth (as Tracy Bregman)
BarBara Luna as Cat (as Barbara Luna) 
June Barrett as Icy
Aimée Eccles as Spider    
Sondra Currie as Katherine 
Peter Brown as Danny
Camille Keaton as Rita Newman
Sean O'Kane as Athlete (uncredited)

References

External links

1982 films
American prison drama films
Women in prison films
1980s prison films
1980s exploitation films
Films directed by Tom DeSimone
1980s English-language films
1980s American films